Joan Stevens  (10 December 1908 – 11 June 1990) was a notable New Zealand teacher and university professor of English. She was born in Southwick, Sussex, England, in 1908.

In the 1974 Queen's Birthday Honours, Stevens was appointed a Commander of the Order of the British Empire, for services to teaching and scholarship.

References

1908 births
1990 deaths
Academic staff of the Victoria University of Wellington
New Zealand Commanders of the Order of the British Empire
New Zealand schoolteachers
British emigrants to New Zealand
New Zealand women academics
People from Southwick, West Sussex